Kill Devil Hills is a town in Dare County, North Carolina, United States. The population was 7,633 at the 2020 census, up from 6,683 in 2010.  It is the most populous settlement in both Dare County and on the Outer Banks of North Carolina.  The Kill Devil Hills Micropolitan Statistical Area is part of the larger Virginia Beach-Norfolk, VA-NC Combined Statistical Area.

The town was founded and developed on the site of the Wright brothers' first controlled, powered airplane flights on December 17, 1903, chosen for its good winds. It was commemorated by the Wright Brothers National Memorial, which was dedicated in 1932. At the time of the Wright Flyer flights, the town of Kill Devil Hills did not exist, and it did not receive its municipal charter until 1953. Kitty Hawk, popularly noted as the site of the famous flights, is approximately four miles (6 km) to the north, and was the nearest settlement at the time of the famous flight.

History
Kill Devil Hills is the site of the Wright Brothers National Memorial, commemorating the siblings' four powered airplane flights in the Wright Flyer on Thursday, December 17, 1903.  Orville returned in 1911, and on October 25 he set a new world glider record, remaining in the air 10 minutes and 34 seconds, soaring against the wind with very little forward movement.

In addition to the Wright Brothers National Memorial, Sam's Diner in the town is on the National Register of Historic Places, listed in 1999.

Geography

Kill Devil Hills is located at  (36.025448, −75.670105), on the barrier islands known as the Outer Banks.

As a result of its climate and proximity to beaches, the population rises significantly in Kill Devil Hills and other towns located on the Outer Banks during the summer months.

Demographics

2020 census

As of the 2020 United States census, there were 7,656 people, 3,170 households, and 1,809 families residing in the town.

2000 census
As of the census of 2000, there were 5,897 people, 2,585 households, and 1,491 families residing in the town. The population density was 1,067.8 people per square mile (412.5/km2). There were 5,302 housing units at an average density of 960.1 per square mile (370.9/km2). The racial makeup of the town was 96.40% White, 0.61% African American, 0.17% Native American, 0.59% Asian, 0.12% Pacific Islander, 1.05% from other races, and 1.05% from two or more races. Hispanic or Latino of any race were 2.95% of the population. 26.4% had children under the age of 18 living with them, 44.2% were married couples living together, 9.6% had a female householder with no husband present, and 42.3% were non-families. 27.9% of all households were made up of individuals, and 6.5% had someone living alone who was 65 years of age or older. The average household size was 2.28 and the average family size was 2.77.

In the town, the population was spread out, with 20.9% under the age of 18, 7.5% from 18 to 24, 38.1% from 25 to 44, 22.8% from 45 to 64, and 10.7% who were 65 years of age or older. The median age was 37 years. For every 100 females, there were 105.0 males. For every 100 females age 18 and over, there were 106.3 males.

The median income for a household in the town was $39,713, and the median income for a family was $44,681. Males had a median income of $31,431 versus $23,206 for females. The per capita income for the town was $20,679. About 5.2% of families and 8.3% of the population were below the poverty line, including 7.8% of those under age 18 and 5.5% of those age 65 or over.

Kill Devil Hills is part of North Carolina's 3rd congressional district, represented by Republican Greg Murphy; who was elected in a special election to fill the seat vacated by the death of longtime Republican Congressman Walter B. Jones following Jones' death on February 10, 2019.

Sports
Kill Devil Hills is home to the Outer Banks Daredevils of the Tidewater Summer League, a collegiate summer baseball league.  The Daredevils play at First Flight Baseball Complex on Veterans Drive in Kill Devil Hills.  The team, founded in 1997, began play in Kill Devil Hills in 2005.

Transportation

First Flight Airport  is a public use airport which is owned by the National Park Service (NPS), and located one mile west of Kill Devil Hills.

For the 12-month period ending August 19, 2009, the airport had 38,120 aircraft operations, an average of 104 per day: 97% general aviation, 3% air taxi, and <1% military.

The airport is notable for being the site of hundreds of pre-flight gliding experiments carried out by the Wright brothers.  The U.S. Centennial of Flight Commission chose First Flight Airport as one of the stops for the National Air Tour 2003.

Education
It is within Dare County Schools.

First Flight Elementary School and First Flight Middle School are in Kill Devil Hills, just south of the Monument.  Kill Devil Hills is also served by First Flight High School.  The school first opened on Tuesday, August 17, 2004, to 800 students.  Previously, high school students from Kill Devil Hills attended Manteo High School.

Some portions of Kill Devil Hills are zoned to Nags Head Elementary instead of First Flight Elementary. Previously Kitty Hawk Elementary School served areas north of Collington Road/Ocean Bay Bridge while First Flight Elementary served points south. Boundaries changed when Nags Head Elementary opened in 2005.

Dare County Library has a branch in Kill Devil Hills.

Climate

According to the Trewartha climate classification system, Kill Devil Hills, North Carolina has a humid subtropical climate with hot and humid summers, cool winters and year-round precipitation (Cfak). Cfak climates are characterized by all months having an average mean temperature > 32.0 °F (> 0.0 °C), at least eight months with an average mean temperature ≥ 50.0 °F (≥ 10.0 °C), at least one month with an average mean temperature ≥ 71.6 °F (≥ 22.0 °C) and no significant precipitation difference between seasons. During the summer months in Kill Devil Hills, a cooling afternoon sea breeze is present on most days, but episodes of extreme heat and humidity can occur with heat index values ≥ 100 °F (≥ 38 °C). Kill Devil Hills is prone to hurricane strikes, particularly during the Atlantic hurricane season which extends from June 1 through November 30, sharply peaking from late August through September. During the winter months, episodes of cold and wind can occur with wind chill values < 10 °F (< -12 °C). The plant hardiness zone in Kill Devil Hills is 8b with an average annual extreme minimum air temperature of 17.0 °F (-8.3 °C). The average seasonal (Dec-Mar) snowfall total is < 2 inches (< 5 cm), and the average annual peak in nor'easter activity is in February.

Ecology

According to the A. W. Kuchler U.S. potential natural vegetation types, Kill Devil Hills, North Carolina would have a dominant vegetation type of Live oak/Sea Oats Uniola paniculata (90) with a dominant vegetation form of Coastal Prairie (20).

Popular culture
 In March 2011, it was announced that bass guitarist Rex Brown (Pantera) and drummer Vinny Appice (Heaven & Hell, Black Sabbath, Dio) had formed a new band called Kill Devil Hill.
The closing scenes of the 1983 film Brainstorm take place at the Wright Brothers National Memorial visitor's center in Kill Devil Hills.

See also
 Wright Brothers National Memorial

References

External links

 
 Story of how Kill Devil Hills got its name (outerbanksdistilling.com)

Towns in Dare County, North Carolina
Towns in North Carolina
Beaches of North Carolina
Outer Banks
Wright brothers
Beaches of Dare County, North Carolina
Populated coastal places in North Carolina